Founded in 1914, the National Foreign Trade Council (NFTC) is an American trade association advocating an open, rules-based international trade system. It serves its hundreds of member companies in activities encompassing international trade policy and international tax policy. The NFTC is headquartered in Washington, D.C. Its current president is Jake Colvin.

History
The organization was founded in 1914 by James A. Farrell, the President of US Steel.  As the leader of that company, he grew sales through international exports and became an early advocate for global trade.

Activities
NFTC develops and advocates trade and export finance policies that maximize the competitiveness of its member companies in the global marketplace. The NFTC overturned the Massachusetts Burma Law before the U.S. Supreme Court in Crosby v. National Foreign Trade Council.

References

External links
National Foreign Trade Council - Website.
USA*Engage - Website.
National Foreign Trade Council records (1914-1985) at Hagley Museum and Library

Foreign trade of the United States
Foreign policy political advocacy groups in the United States
1914 establishments in the United States
Organizations established in 1914